Rave In2 the Joy Fantastic is a remix album by American recording artist Prince, under the unpronounceable "Love Symbol", as shown on the album cover. It was released on April 29, 2001 by NPG Records and contains remixes of songs found on Prince's twenty-third studio album, Rave Un2 the Joy Fantastic (1999). It was issued via mail exclusively through the NPG Music Club, an Internet subscription service; due to this circumstance, the album was not able to chart.

The album is an alternative version of Rave Un2 the Joy Fantastic, containing 13 of the album's tracks, plus a previously unreleased track entitled "Beautiful Strange". Besides remixes of the mentioned tracks, Rave In2 the Joy Fantastic also contains several extended songs, plus a trimmed version of "Wherever U Go, Whatever U Do". The album also does not contain "Segue" tracks, that were used several times in the previous album.

Background and release 
Rave In2 the Joy Fantastic is an alternative version of Prince's 1999 studio album Rave Un2 the Joy Fantastic. Unlike Prince's previous efforts, the album was not released commercially. Instead, an internet subscription service co-founded by Prince, NPG Music Club, issued the album via mail. Due to this, Rave In2 the Joy Fantastic also was not able to chart anywhere. Recording sessions for the parent album took place in Prince's hometown of Chanhassen, Minnesota, at Paisley Park Studios, plus at Electric Lady Studios in California and O'Henry Sound Studios in New York City.

The album was released as a limited edition CD on April 30, 2001, exclusively through the NPG Music Club. Since then the album has been out of print and has been unavailable for purchase until 2019. It was made available through streaming platforms including Spotify and Apple Music on August 17, 2018 alongside most of Prince's albums between 1995 and 2010.

Ultimate Rave 
In April 2019, Rave In2 the Joy Fantastic was released posthumously as part of the special edition box set Ultimate Rave which also contains the original album Rave Un2 the Joy Fantastic and the concert DVD Rave Un2 the Year 2000. The box set charted in the Netherlands.

Composition 
Almost the entire album consists of songs from Rave Un2 the Joy Fantastic, minus "Beautiful Strange", which was a previously unreleased recording. Unlike the former album, Rave In2 the Joy Fantastic does not include any "Segue" tracks. The album opens with "Rave In2 the Joy Fantastic", similar to the opening song on the parent album. "The Greatest Romance Ever Sold" also includes a verse from Eve, along with an additional three minutes of production; the album's fourth song is the Nasty Girl remix of "Hot Wit' U", however, this version does not include the Eve verse.

An extended version of "Tangerine" occurs, followed by "So Far, So Pleased", a duet with Gwen Stefani. The aforementioned track and "The Sun, the Moon and Stars" both appear in their untouched versions on the album. A remix of promotional single "Man'O'War" is the eighth recording, immediately followed by a lengthier version of other promotional single "Baby Knows". "I Love U, but I Don't Trust U Anymore" is also the original version of the track from Rave Un2, and includes a verse from folk rock singer Ani DiFranco, who plays an acoustic guitar.

The album's eleventh song is the previously unreleased "Beautiful Strange", which was later used as the name of a DVD released by Prince in 2010. The following recording is "Silly Game", which is the album's final untouched song. Alternative versions of "Wherever U Go, Whatever U Do" and "Prettyman" close the album, with the latter being a hidden track.

Track listing

Personnel 
Credits adapted from the album's liner notes.

 Prince – all other vocals and instruments
 Mike Scott – guitar
 Ani DiFranco – acoustic guitar
 Rhonda Smith – acoustic bass, bass
 Kirk Johnson – drums, percussion
 Michael B. – drums
 Kenni Holmen – saxophone
 Kathy Jensen – saxophone
 Maceo Parker – saxophone
 Steve Strand – trumpet
 Dave Jensen – trumpet
 Michael B. Nelson – trombone

 Gwen Stefani – co-lead vocals
 Sheryl Crow – co-lead vocals and harmonica
 Marva King – backing vocals
 Larry Graham – backing vocals
 DuJuan Blackshire – backing vocals
 Johnnie Blackshire – backing vocals
 Kip Blackshire – vocoder vocals
 Chuck D – vocals
 Eve – vocals
 Bros. Jules – scratches
 Clare Fischer – orchestration

Charts

Release history

References 

2001 remix albums
Albums produced by Prince (musician)
NPG Records remix albums
Prince (musician) remix albums